Nancy Hsueh (February 25, 1941 – November 24, 1980) was an American actress. She was one of the first Asian American actresses to have a leading role in a U.S. television series, Love is a Many Splendored Thing (1967), regarded as the first American soap opera to portray an interracial relationship between an Asian woman and a white man. She also appeared in films such as War Hunt (1962), Cheyenne Autumn (1964), and Targets (1968).

Career
Born in Los Angeles, California, Hsueh made two films as a child actress, China's Little Devils (1945) and Intrigue (1947), on which her father served as a technical adviser.

In the early 1960s, she appeared in the Korean War drama War Hunt (1962) and the John Ford Western Cheyenne Autumn (1964). According to author Jon Abbott, "her exotic appearance kept her busy in the spy shows of the period, including The Man from U.N.C.L.E., I Spy, and The Wild, Wild West."

In 1967, she was cast as the female lead in the CBS soap opera Love is a Many Splendored Thing. The series was initially intended as a continuation of the 1955 film of the same name, which told the story of an interracial relationship between an American reporter and a Eurasian doctor. Hsueh portrayed Mia Elliott, the daughter of the couple in the original film. However, CBS censors became uncomfortable with the series' portrayal of an interracial romance between a Eurasian woman (Hsueh) and a white American doctor (Robert Milli), and Hsueh's character was written out of the series within one year.

Her most prominent film role was as Boris Karloff's personal assistant in Peter Bogdanovich's Targets (1968). She had only a few small parts in film and television in the 1970s; her final acting role was in House Calls (1978).

Personal life
Hsueh was the daughter of Wei Fan Hsueh, who was born in Nanking, China, and Evelyn Postal, who was of Native American and Scottish-Irish descent. She majored in education at the University of California, Los Angeles. 

On January 16, 1965, she married Daniel Carr, whom she had met during filming of Cheyenne Autumn.

She died of atherosclerosis in Portland, Maine on November 24, 1980, aged 39.

Filmography
 China's Little Devils (1945) as Baby
 Intrigue (1947) as Mia, orphan girl
 Flower Drum Song (1961) as Girl (uncredited)
  War Hunt (1962) as Mama San
  Cheyenne Autumn (1964) as Little Bird (uncredited)
 Lt. Robin Crusoe, U.S.N. (1966) as Native Girl
 Doctor, You've Got to Be Kidding! (1967) as Joan Mavis (uncredited)
 Targets (1968) as Jenny
 House Calls (1978) as Gretchen

Notes

References

External links 
 

 1980 deaths
Actresses from Los Angeles
American actresses of Chinese descent
1941 births
20th-century American actresses
American film actresses
American television actresses
American people who self-identify as being of Native American descent
American people of Scotch-Irish descent
University of California, Los Angeles alumni